Junodia strigipennis is a species of praying mantis found Ethiopia, Mozambique, South Africa, Tanzania, and Zimbabwe. It was previously identified as Oxypilus strigipennis.

See also
List of mantis genera and species

References

Junodia
Insects of Mozambique
Insects of Ethiopia
Insects of Zimbabwe
Mantodea of Africa
Insects described in 1889
Insects of Tanzania